The Sonoran horned lizard (Phrynosoma goodei) is a horned lizard species native to Arizona in the United States and Mexico.

References

Phrynosoma
Reptiles of Mexico
Reptiles described in 1893
Taxa named by Leonhard Stejneger